A Gamut of Games is an innovative book of games written by Sid Sackson and first published in 1969. It contains rules for a large number of paper and pencil, card, and board games. Many of the games in the book had never before been published.  It is considered by many hobbyist gamers to be an essential text for anyone interested in abstract strategy games, and a number of the rules were later expanded into full-fledged published board games.

Some of the games which were later sold separately include Focus, Property and Origins of World War I; Robert Abbott expanded his game Crossings, published here, into the more-refined title Epaminondas.  Many of the games covered in the book were creations of Sid Sackson himself, who was a prolific game designer.

Book Sections
The sections of the book and the games covered therein are as follows:

In Search of Big and Little Games
Blue and Gray, a board game by Henry Busch and Arthur Jaeger
Hekaton, a card game originally published along with "Yankee Notion Cards" from the 19th century
Le Truc, a revived French card game
Mate, a card game by G. Capellen
Plank, a serious revamp of the concepts in Tic-Tac-Toe
Zetema, a Victorian card game similar to Bezique

Game Inventors Are People Too
Crossings, a board game by Robert Abbott; later turned into Epaminondas
Cups, a mancala variant by Arthur and Wald Amberstone
Knight Chase, a board game by Alex Randolph (inventor of games like TwixT)
Lap, a complex progeny of Battleships by Lech Pijanowski
Lines of Action, a board game by Claude Soucie
Origins of World War I, a historical pencil-and-paper game by Jim Dunnigan which teaches players history
Paks, a playing card game by Phil Laurence
Skedoodle, a pencil-and-paper game by Father Daniel
Three Musketeers, a board game by Haar Hoolim; notably, this game and the character in it was once used as the mascot for the Zillions of Games software product

Those Protean Pieces of Pasteboard
All of the games in this section use a standard pack of cards.
All My Diamonds, an auctioning game by Sid Sackson
Bowling Solitaire, a one-player game by Sid Sackson that simulates ten-pin bowling.
Card Baseball, by Sid Sackson
Color Gin, a two-handed modification of Hollywood Gin by Sid Sackson
Osmosis, by Sid Sackson
Patterns, by Sid Sackson
Poke, a two-player multi-genre card game that combines strong elements of Poker with trick-taking games 
Slam, a two-handed takeoff of Bridge by Sid Sackson
Suit Yourself, by Sid Sackson

New Battles on an Old Battlefield
All of the games in this section use a checkerboard.
Focus, by Sid Sackson; this game was later sold commercially
Network, by Sid Sackson
Take It Away, by Sid Sackson

Grab a Pencil
All of the games in this section are meant to be played with pencil and paper.
Cutting Corners, by Sid Sackson; another attempt at a "boredom" game
Hold That Line, by Sid Sackson; an attempt to move "boredom" games away from Tic-Tac-Toe
Last Word, a paper-based Scrabble-esque game by Sid Sackson
Paper Boxing, by Sid Sackson
Patterns II, an inductive-reasoning game by Sid Sackson; see Eleusis for another game in this small genre
Property, later republished as New York, by Sid Sackson

A Miscellany of Games
Change Change, a simple solitaire utilizing coins by Sid Sackson
Domino Bead Game, by Sid Sackson
Haggle, a deliciously confusing party game by Sid Sackson
Solitaire Dice, by Sid Sackson; published commercially under the names Choice, Einstein, and Can't Stop Express
The No Game, a classic and simple party game

A second edition of the book was published in 1982; Dover Publications released an unabridged reprint, with an additional preface by Sackson, in 1992.

Reviews
Games
Games and Puzzles

References 
Sackson, Sid. A Gamut of Games.

Notes

1969 books
Books about board games